Buin (also Romanized as Bū’īn and Būyīn) is a village in Sonbolabad Rural District, Soltaniyeh District, Abhar County, Zanjan Province, Iran. At the 2006 census, its population was 1,226, in 326 families.

References 

Populated places in Abhar County